Ferrell Edmunds Jr. (born April 16, 1965 in South Boston, Virginia) is an American former professional football player who was a tight end in the National Football League (NFL). 

Edmunds currently coaches the varsity football program at Dan River High School in Ringgold, Virginia. His three sons Trey, Terrell and Tremaine all currently play in the NFL. Tremaine plays for the Chicago Bears. Trey and Terrell both currently play for the Pittsburgh Steelers.

Edmunds graduated from George Washington High School (Danville, Virginia) in 1983.

References

1965 births
Living people
American Conference Pro Bowl players
American football tight ends
Maryland Terrapins football players
Miami Dolphins players
People from South Boston, Virginia
Seattle Seahawks players